Great Naval Battles is a series of computer games by Strategic Simulations which simulate combat between naval vessels. It consist of five separate games, four of which  depict various phases of World War II. Each game combines a wider view of the action on a fleet scale, as well as controls for individual ships. SSI covered similar themes in another naval game, Fighting Steel, which was released afterwards, in 1999.

Games in series
The game series contains the following games:

 Great Naval Battles: North Atlantic 1939-1943 was released in 1992 and depicts naval warfare in the North Atlantic during World War 2.

 Great Naval Battles: Guadalcanal 1942-1943 depicts naval combat in the Pacific Ocean during World War 2.

 Great Naval Battles Vol. III: Fury in the Pacific, 1941–1944 is a direct sequel to #2 and depicts the remainder of the Pacific Ocean war. It was not considered to be as strong a product as the previous two games, as it had some problems with bugs. the game structure was problematic due to some attempts to include air combat.

 Great Naval Battles 4: Burning Steel 1939–1942 was released in 1995 and constituted a major overhaul of the game. It utilized entirely new procedures and interfaces. Several new features were provided, including the ability to full customize each combat scenario.

 Great Naval Battles V: Demise of the Dreadnoughts; 1914–18 is set in World War I, and does not include aircraft. It was only sold in the boxed set Great Naval Battles – the Final Fury, which contained all games of the series plus GNBNA.

Gameplay and dynamics
Every game provides a choice between individual ship views and fleet command views. Players can choose individual stations to operate during the game.

Background music

Great Naval Battles: North Atlantic 1939–1943
When "British" is being selected for the gameplay, Rule Britannia is being played. Whereas if "German" is being selected, Unter dem Doppeladler is being played.

Great Naval Battles Vol. II: Guadalcanal 1942–43

Great Naval Battles Vol. III: Fury in the Pacific, 1941–1944

Great Naval Battles 4: Burning Steel 1939–1942

Great Naval Battles V: Demise of the Dreadnoughts; 1914–18

See also
 Naval warfare
 Harpoon (series)

References

External links
 
 Article comparing all games at naval wargame website
Review of game 1 at naval gaming website
Review of game #4 at subsim.com

DOS games
Ship simulation games
Naval video games
World War II video games
Naval games
Strategic Simulations games
Video game franchises
Video game franchises introduced in 1992
Video games developed in the United States
Computer wargames